Pargat Singh (born 5 March 1965) is a hockey player turned politician in India and belongs to the Indian National Congress in Punjab. He is a former Indian hockey player and his playing position was full back.  He captained Indian men's hockey team at 1992 Barcelona Olympics and 1996 Atlanta Olympics. He has worked as an SP with Punjab police before taking a plunge into politics.

Champions Trophy

1985 (Perth)
India vs Germany: At one point of time score board was ticking 1–5.  Pargat Singh came forward and  scored 4 goals in the last 6 minutes. The result was a draw but it made Pargat Singh known.

1986 (Karachi)
He played against Holland to give India a 3–2 victory.

Olympics
He captained Indian men's hockey team at 1992 Barcelona Olympics and 1996 Atlanta Olympics.

Political career
In 2003, He was vice-president of the Surjit Singh Memorial Hockey Tournament Society of Jalandhar.

Shiromani Akali Dal
Singh was nominated for Jalandhar Cantonment Assembly constituency seat as SAD nominee which he subsequently won defeating Jagbir Singh Brar  of Congress.

He was suspended by SAD in July 2016.

He along with Navjot Singh Sidhu and Bains brothers formed a new political front - Aawaaz-e-Punjab claiming to fight against those working against Punjab.

Congress
Singh was one of the 42 INC MLAs who submitted their resignation in protest of a decision of the Supreme Court of India ruling Punjab's termination of the Sutlej-Yamuna Link (SYL) water canal unconstitutional.

He has been a Congress MLA since 2017 from the Jalandhar Cantt constituency. He has been nominated again by Jalandhar Cantt for elections 2022. He is going to contest the Punjab assembly elections for the third time in a row. The Aam Aadmi Party gained a strong 79% majority in the sixteenth Punjab Legislative Assembly by winning 92 out of 117 seats in the 2022 Punjab Legislative Assembly election. MP Bhagwant Mann was sworn in as Chief Minister on 16 March 2022.

In 2017, he was nominated as the General Secretary of Hockey Punjab.

Awards

References

External links
 
 

1965 births
Living people
Field hockey players at the 1988 Summer Olympics
Field hockey players at the 1992 Summer Olympics
Field hockey players at the 1996 Summer Olympics
Recipients of the Arjuna Award
Indian Sikhs
Recipients of the Padma Shri in sports
Field hockey players from Jalandhar
Former members of Shiromani Akali Dal
Punjab, India MLAs 2022–2027
Punjab, India MLAs 2012–2017
Indian sportsperson-politicians
Indian male field hockey players
Field hockey players at the 1986 Asian Games
Field hockey players at the 1990 Asian Games
Asian Games medalists in field hockey
Asian Games silver medalists for India
Asian Games bronze medalists for India
Medalists at the 1986 Asian Games
Medalists at the 1990 Asian Games
1990 Men's Hockey World Cup players
Olympic field hockey players of India
Punjab, India MLAs 2017–2022